Diaby is a surname, and may refer to:

Abdoulay Diaby (born 1991), Malian football player
Abou Diaby (born 1986), French football midfielder
Aboubakar Diaby Ouattara, Ivorian diplomat
Alassane Diaby (born 1995), French-born Malian football player
Karamba Diaby (born 1961), Senegalese-born German chemist and politician
Karim Coulibaly Diaby (born 1989), French-Ivorian football striker
Lassina Diaby (born 1992), Ivorian footballer
Mohamed Diaby (born 1990), Ivorian football midfielder
Moussa Diaby (born 1999), French football forward
Oumar Diaby (born 1990), French football forward
Oumarou Diaby (born 1987), French football midfielder
Sékana Diaby (born 1968), former Ivorian football defender
Souleymane Diaby (born 1987), Ivorian football striker of Guinean descent
YaYa Diaby (born 1999), American football player